The Mercedes-Benz Museum is an automobile museum in Stuttgart, Germany. It covers the history of the Mercedes-Benz brand and the brands associated with it. Stuttgart is home to the Mercedes-Benz brand and the international headquarters of the Mercedes-Benz Group.

The museum building
The current building, which stands directly outside the main gate of the Daimler factory in Stuttgart, was designed by UN Studio. It is based on a unique cloverleaf concept using three overlapping circles with the center removed to form a triangular atrium recalling the shape of a Wankel engine. The building was completed and opened on 19 May 2006. Architecture and exhibition concept are closely interwoven, as exhibition designer HG Merz had already been commissioned before the architecture competition in 2001.

The building's height and "double helix" interior were designed to maximise space, providing  of exhibition space on a footprint of just . The double helix also corresponds to the exhibition concept, which divides the museum into the "legend rooms" and the "collections", offering two alternative tours that can be merged at any given point of the museum.

The museum contains more than 160 vehicles, some dating back to the very earliest days of the motorcar engine. The vehicles are maintained by the Mercedes-Benz Classic Center of Fellbach. Previously, the museum was housed in a dedicated building within the factory complex and visitors had in recent decades been transported from the main gate by a secured shuttle.

Other details
The museum provides visitors with free audio tours in a variety of languages. In 2007, the museum was visited by 860,000 people.

Visitors are also offered the opportunity to take a tour of the nearby Untertürkheim engine factory. The factory produces many of the company's diesel engines.

Gallery

See also
 Automuseum Dr. Carl Benz
 List of automobile museums
 Mercedes-Benz World
 Museum for Historical Maybach Vehicles

Further reading

References

External links

  

 

Mercedes-Benz
Museums in Stuttgart
Tourist attractions in Stuttgart
Automobile museums in Germany